Martin Bútora (born 7 October 1944) is a Slovak sociologist, writer, university professor and diplomat.

Political career
In November 1989 he was a founding member of the political movement Public Against Violence, the leading movement of the democratic revolution in Slovakia. He was the human rights advisor to the former president of Czechoslovakia Václav Havel from 1990 to 1992.

In 1997 he co-founded the Institute for Public Affairs (IVO) where he served as its first president.

He was the Slovak Ambassador to the United States from 1999 to 2003.

Bútora placed 6th in the 2004 presidential election, receiving 6.5% of the vote.

Bútora is a member of the advisory board of the Prague European Summit.

Scholarship
In the first half of the 1990s he taught at the Charles University of Prague and at the Trnava University.

His sociological work focuses on international politics, transatlantic relations, human rights, and minorities.

Key publications
 Abschied von der Tschechoslowakei: Ursachen und Folgen der tschechisch-slowakischen Trennung (Farewell to Czechoslovakia: Causes and Consequences of the Czech-Slovak Separation). Köln : Verlag Wissenschaft und Politik, 1993.  (with Rüdiger Kipke and Karel Vodička)
 "Slovakia's Democratic Awakening," Journal of Democracy 10 (1, 1999): 80–95 (with Zora Bútorova)
 We Saw the Holocaust. Bratislava: Milan Šimečka Foundation, 2005.  (eds., with Nadácia Milana Šimečku, et al.)
 Active Citizenship and the Nongovernmental Sector in Slovakia: Trends and Perspectives. Bratislava: Včelí Dom, 2012.  (with Zora Bútorova and Boris Strečanský)

Honors and awards
 1999 – Democracy Service Medal, National Endowment for Democracy, Washington, D.C.
 2000 – Ján Papánek Medal
 2000 – Order of Ľudovít Štúr, for his contribution to defense of human rights and development of civil society, awarded by Rudolf Schuster, President of Slovakia.
 2002 – Celebration of Freedom Award, American Jewish Committee
 2012 – Czech and Slovak Freedom Lecture, Woodrow Wilson Center, Washington, DC
 2019 - VIZE 97 Prize

References

External links
 Martin Bútora "CV and abstract", Institute for Public Affairs, Bratislava
 "Interviews: Martin Bútora," The Freedom Collection, George W. Bush Institute, Southern Methodist University, University Park, Texas

1944 births
Living people
Diplomats from Bratislava
Public Against Violence politicians
Slovak sociologists
Academic staff of the University of Trnava
Ambassadors of Slovakia to the United States
Academic staff of Charles University
Candidates for President of Slovakia
Order of Ľudovít Štúr